Central Leaksville Historic District is a national historic district located at Eden, Rockingham County, North Carolina. It encompasses 67 contributing buildings, 2 contributing sites, and 1 contributing object in a residential section of the town of Eden.  It was developed from about 1815 to about 1935, and includes notable examples of Italianate, Queen Anne, Colonial Revival, and Bungalow style architecture.  Notable buildings include the Rogers-Martin-Taylor House (c. 1815), Saunders-Hege House (c. 1850), Robinson-Dillard-Martin House (c. 1860), Lawson-Moir-Clayton House (c. 1842), Episcopal Church of the Epiphany (1844), J. M. Hopper House (1885), Norman-DeHart House (c. 1925), and Casteen House (c. 1920).

It was listed on the National Register of Historic Places in 1986.

References

Historic districts on the National Register of Historic Places in North Carolina
Italianate architecture in North Carolina
Queen Anne architecture in North Carolina
Colonial Revival architecture in North Carolina
Buildings and structures in Rockingham County, North Carolina
National Register of Historic Places in Rockingham County, North Carolina